Sander Thonhauser is a Dutch professional mixed martial artist. He competes in the Heavyweight division. He is a RINGS Holland veteran and has also fought for many other top promotions.
His Mixed martial arts debut was on June 29, 1997. Sander has not fought since 2005, where he lost to Murad Chunkaiev by submission on April 3, 2005.

Mixed martial arts record

|-
| Loss
| align=center| 11-9 (1)
| Murad Chunkaiev
| Submission (Armbar)
| Rings Holland: Armed and Dangerous
| 
| align=center| 1
| align=center| 2:01
| Utrecht City, Netherlands
| 
|-
| Win
| align=center| 11-8 (1)
| Raoulet Salim
| KO (Knee and Punches)
| Rings Holland: Born Invincible
| 
| align=center| 2
| align=center| 1:29
| Utrecht City, Netherlands
| 
|-
| Win
| align=center| 10-8 (1)
| Michael Knaap
| KO (Punch)
| Rings Holland: World's Greatest
| 
| align=center| 2
| align=center| 4:45
| Utrecht City, Netherlands
| 
|-
| Loss
| align=center| 9-8 (1)
| Ibragim Magomedov
| KO (Punches)
| 2H2H: 2 Hot 2 Handle
| 
| align=center| 1
| align=center| 3:32
| Amsterdam, Netherlands
| 
|-
| Win
| align=center| 9-7 (1)
| Ladislav Zak
| Submission (Guillotine Choke)
| 2H2H: 2 Hot 2 Handle
| 
| align=center| 1
| align=center| 0:43
| Amsterdam, Netherlands
| 
|-
| Win
| align=center| 8-7 (1)
| Olaf in 't Veld
| KO (Punch)
| 2H2H: 2 Hot 2 Handle
| 
| align=center| 1
| align=center| 0:09
| Amsterdam, Netherlands
| 
|-
| Win
| align=center| 7-7 (1)
| Ladislav Zak
| Decision
| Gym Alkmaar: Fight Gala
| 
| align=center| 0
| align=center| 0:00
| Netherlands
| 
|-
| Loss
| align=center| 6-7 (1)
| Andrey Rudakov
| Submission (Leglock)
| DF: Durata World Grand Prix 3
| 
| align=center| 1
| align=center| 0:00
| Zagreb, Croatia
| 
|-
| Loss
| align=center| 6-6 (1)
| Marc Emmanuel
| Submission (Keylock)
| Rings Holland: No Guts, No Glory
| 
| align=center| 2
| align=center| 0:36
| Amsterdam, Netherlands
| 
|-
| Win
| align=center| 6-5 (1)
| Colin Sexton
| TKO (Cut)
| FFH: Free Fight Explosion 1
| 
| align=center| 0
| align=center| 0:00
| Beverwijk, Netherlands
| 
|-
| NC
| align=center| 5-5 (1)
| Lee Hasdell
| No Contest
| Rings Holland: Heroes Live Forever
| 
| align=center| 1
| align=center| 0:00
| Utrecht, Netherlands
| 
|-
| Loss
| align=center| 5-5
| Kavkaz Sultanmagomedov
| TKO (Punches)
| WVC 8: World Vale Tudo Championship 8
| 
| align=center| 1
| align=center| 2:47
| Aruba
| 
|-
| Loss
| align=center| 5-4
| Zaza Tkeshelashvili
| TKO (5 Lost Points)
| Rings: Rise 2nd
| 
| align=center| 1
| align=center| 4:02
| Japan
| 
|-
| Win
| align=center| 5-3
| Joe Akano
| TKO (Punches)
| Rings Holland: Judgement Day
| 
| align=center| 2
| align=center| 0:00
| Amsterdam, Netherlands
| 
|-
| Win
| align=center| 4-3
| Artur Mariano
| TKO
| FFH: Free Fight Gala
| 
| align=center| 0
| align=center| 0:00
| Beverwijk, Netherlands
| 
|-
| Win
| align=center| 3-3
| Scott Goddard
| Decision (Split)
| Rings Holland: The Thialf Explosion
| 
| align=center| 2
| align=center| 5:00
| Heerenveen, Netherlands
| 
|-
| Loss
| align=center| 2-3
| Ruslan Kerselyan
| TKO
| M-1 MFC: European Championship 1998
| 
| align=center| 1
| align=center| 0:00
| St. Petersburg, Russia
| 
|-
| Loss
| align=center| 2-2
| Lee Hasdell
| Submission (Arm-Triangle Choke)
| NOTS 1: Night of the Samurai 1
| 
| align=center| 1
| align=center| 0:55
| Milton Keynes, England
| For the Vacant TFF Vale Tudo Superfight title.
|-
| Win
| align=center| 2-1
| Cees Bezems
| Submission (Scarf Hold Armlock)
| Rings Holland: The King of Rings
| 
| align=center| 1
| align=center| 0:58
| Amsterdam, Netherlands
| 
|-
| Loss
| align=center| 1-1
| Vidal Serradilla
| DQ
| FFH: Free Fight Gala
| 
| align=center| 0
| align=center| 0:00
| Beverwijk, Netherlands
| 
|-
| Win
| align=center| 1-0
| Gerard Benschop
| KO (Palm Strikes)
| Rings Holland: Utrecht at War
| 
| align=center| 1
| align=center| 3:04
| Utrecht, Netherlands
|

References

External links 
 
 Fighting Network RINGS Fight History

Year of birth missing (living people)
Living people
Dutch male mixed martial artists
Heavyweight mixed martial artists
Place of birth missing (living people)